The Industrial Cases Reports is a series of law reports published by the Incorporated Council of Law Reporting. It focuses on employment law, covering cases from the Employment Appeal Tribunal and above.

External links
 The ICR Express

Case law reporters of the United Kingdom
United Kingdom labour case law